The Yemen Post was a newspaper in Yemen published from 2007 and now defunct. It was also Yemen's first hourly updated online news service with reporters spread throughout the country. The Yemen Post hard copy version was distributed mostly in Yemen and was first launched in a newspaper format on 2 November 2007. The newspaper is distributed to over 2000 government institutions, embassies, organizations, businesses throughout Yemen. Along with the foreign distribution to neighboring countries, the Yemen Post is also distributed to some communities within Europe and the United States. The format of the newspaper was changed to a full-colored, top of the art tabloid format on 16 February 2009. The paper was founded by the current publisher and editor in chief, Hakim Almasmari.

The Yemen Post still functions but reports it has been blocked in Yemen. It relocated to Twitter and its account was last active in 2019.

See also
List of newspapers in Yemen

References

External links

Publications established in 2007
2007 establishments in Yemen
English-language newspapers published in Arab countries

Defunct newspapers published in Yemen